Elections were held in Perth County, Ontario on October 24, 2022 in conjunction with municipal elections across the province.

Perth County Council
Perth County Council consists of 10 members and uses a weighted voting method so that member's votes match the populations of the constituent communities.

North Perth
The following were the results for mayor and deputy mayor of North Perth.

Mayor

Deputy mayor

Perth East
The following were the results for mayor and deputy mayor of Perth East.

Mayor

Deputy mayor

Perth South
Jim Aitcheson was elected as mayor of Perth South by acclamation.

Mayor

West Perth
The following were the results for mayor and deputy mayor of West Perth.

Mayor
Incumbent mayor Walter McKenzie was challenged by deputy mayor Doug Eidt.

Deputy mayor

References

Perth
Perth County, Ontario